WJMJ (88.9 MHz) is a non-profit, non-commercial, FM radio station licensed to Hartford, Connecticut. It is owned by St. Thomas Seminary in Bloomfield, Connecticut, which in turn is owned by the Archdiocese of Hartford. The transmitter tower is atop Johnnycake Mountain in Burlington, Connecticut.   The station has an effective radiated power (ERP) of 2,300 watts. For its programming to be heard in other parts of Connecticut, WJMJ has FM translators on 107.1 in New Haven and on 93.1 in Hamden. It is also heard on a digital subchannel of 91.1 WSHU-FM-HD3 in Fairfield, Connecticut. In addition, WJMJ streams online.

The JMJ in the call sign stands for Jesus, Mary and Joseph. The daytime programming consists of "music you can't hear anywhere else," including soft adult contemporary and soft oldies, hosted by local disc jockeys. Nighttime and Sunday specialty programs feature classical music, adult standards and Roman Catholic talk and teaching shows. Hourly updates come from ABC News Radio. Periodic fundraisers are held on the air to support the station's finances. The station's slogan is “Catholic Radio – Where Faith Meets Life”.

History
In the 1970s, Archbishop John F. Whealon decided to start a radio station as a way to bring the Gospel to a wider audience through a format of inspiring messages and pleasant music. The WJMJ radio studios were originally in Glastonbury, Connecticut. They moved to Bloomfield in the early 1980s. A fire tower originally stood where the WJMJ radio tower is located.

In 2009, the WJMJ studios were moved to Prospect, Connecticut, which also houses the Office of Radio and Television of the Archdiocese of Hartford. That gives the station a signal covering most of Central Connecticut and reaching part of Western Massachusetts.

“Festival of Faith”, the 14-hour block of radio shows on Sunday which included recorded worship services and talk shows produced by an assortment of area Protestant and Eastern Orthodox churches was discontinued in May 2008. On Sunday, June 1, 2008, WJMJ began airing local Catholic programming, as well as material from the EWTN network. WJMJ also carries live Metropolitan Opera broadcasts on Saturday afternoons.

After many years of broadcasting in monaural, FM stereo broadcasts began in January 2009.

Translators

References

External links

 
 
 
 
 Comments re: WJMJ Replacing Non-Catholic Programs (Topix)

1976 establishments in Connecticut
Bloomfield, Connecticut
Burlington, Connecticut
JMJ
Radio stations established in 1976
JMJ